Elvis Kamsoba (born 27 June 1996) is a Burundian professional footballer who plays as a winger for Sepahan and the Burundi national football team.

Club career
In October 2016, Melbourne Knights announced the signing of Elvis Kamsoba for the 2017 NPL Victoria season. Kamsoba scored six goals for Knights in 2017, as his side narrowly avoided relegation, defeating Dandenong City in the promotion-relegation playoff.

Kamsoba came to Australia's attention after a brilliant 2018 FFA Cup campaign for Avondale FC. Avondale went on to make the quarter final, the club's best finish before losing out to reigning champions Sydney FC. As a result of his impressive performances with Avondale, Kamsoba was awarded the inaugural Mike Cockerill Medal, awarded to the best NPL player in the FFA Cup.

Melbourne Victory 
Following a successful trial period, Kamsoba signed for A-League club Melbourne Victory on an 18-month contract on 3 January 2019. He made his professional debut for the club on 9 January 2019 in an A-League match against Adelaide United.

Alongside Jake Brimmer and Rudy Gestede, Kamsoba finished as Melbourne Victory's joint top goalscorer for the 2020–21 A-League season, with 5 goals.

Sydney FC 
At the end of his contract at Melbourne Victory, Kamsoba departed the club and joined Sydney FC on a two-year contract.

Sepahan 
Following a successful season with the harborside Sydney club, in which he contributed with 3 goals in 17 appearances Kamsoba departed the Sky Blues, with the club having accepted an transfer from Iranian club Sepahan, for an undisclosed amount.

Career statistics

Footnotes

A.  Includes appearances in the FFA Cup.
B.  Includes appearances in the AFC Champions League.
C.  Includes appearances in the A-League finals.

International career 
Elvis was eligible to represent both Burundi and Australia. On 24 March 2019 he confirmed that he had rejected a call-up to the Burundi national football team. Two months later, he accepted a call-up for Burundi's provisional squad ahead of the 2019 Africa Cup of Nations. He made his debut on 17 June 2019 in a friendly against Tunisia, as a starter.

Personal life
Born in Burundi, Kamsoba moved with his family to a Tanzanian refugee camp when he was four months old. He lived there for 11 years before migrating to Adelaide, Australia in 2008. Kamsoba's younger brother, Pacifique Niyongabire, currently plays for Valour FC.

Honours

Individual
Michael Cockerill Medal: 2018

References

External links

1996 births
Living people
Burundian footballers
Burundi international footballers
Burundian emigrants to Australia
Australian soccer players
Melbourne Victory FC players
Sydney FC players
National Premier Leagues players
A-League Men players
Association football forwards
2019 Africa Cup of Nations players
Melbourne Knights FC players
Croydon Kings players